Boğaz can refer to:

 Boğaz, Dicle, a village in Turkey
 the Turkish name for Bogazi, a village in Cyprus